Mill Hill School is a 13–18 co-educational private, day and boarding school in Mill Hill, London, England that was established in 1807. It is a member of the Headmasters' and Headmistresses' Conference.

History

A committee of Nonconformist merchants and ministers, including John Pye-Smith founded the school, originally called Mill Hill Grammar School, for boys on 25 January 1807. They located it sufficiently distant of London at that time, because of "dangers both physical and moral awaiting youth while passing through the streets of a large, crowded and corrupt city". A boarding house was opened in the residence once occupied by Peter Collinson, with about 20 boys. John Atkinson was the first headmaster and chaplain until 1810.

Mill Hill School occupies a  site, part of which formed the gardens of Ridgeway House, the house of the botanist Peter Collinson. He was one of the most important importers of rare and exotic plants into English gardens. Many of the species that he introduced to Mill Hill in the 18th Century continue to grow today in the grounds of the School. In 1746 Collinson planted Britain's first hydrangea on the grounds, now located adjacent to School House.

The estate was purchased by the botanist Richard Salisbury in 1802, Ridgeway House became the setting for a long-running scientific dispute between the new owner and his guest, James Edward Smith. The flora of Mill Hill was supplemented by the work of the amateur botanist Richard William Bowry Buckland (died 1947), governor of the foundation from 1878 to 1889, who cultivated a garden in the south-west of the school's grounds for the enjoyment of future generations. He wrote in his diary:

In 1939, Mill Hill School's premises became a hospital. The school was evacuated to St. Bees School in Cumberland for the duration of the Second World War. Collinson House, a school for girls, was named for it. A St Bees Association was founded in commemoration of this period of evacuation in the school's history by Michael Berry and David Smith.

Mill Hill first admitted sixth form girls in 1975 and became fully co-educational in 1997. The BBC news website usually uses a picture taken at Mill Hill School for articles about boarding schools.

In 2005 the school was one of 50 of the country's leading independent schools which were found guilty of running an illegal price-fixing cartel, exposed by The Times. Together they had driven up fees for thousands of parents. Each school was required to pay a nominal penalty of £10,000, and all agreed to make ex-gratia payments totalling three million pounds into a trust. It is to benefit persons who were students at the schools during the cartel period.

In March 2007, Mill Hill celebrated its bicentenary. To mark the occasion, the school was granted a new coat of arms by Robert Noel, Her Majesty's Lancaster Herald.

In 2018, the school experienced controversy when it was featured in the music video of London rapper Stefflon Don. In it, she was shown nude in the changing room showers, dancing on tables in classrooms, and smoking marijuana in the dormitories.

Combined Cadet Force 
Mill Hill has kept the tradition of having a CCF as a legacy of the Mill Hill School Officer Training Corps (OTC). Today the contingent comprises the Army, Royal Navy and Royal Air Force sections, along with an award winning Corps of Drums Platoon.

Fourth Form Training 
Pupils are able to join the CCF at the beginning of the Spring term in year 9, where during the autumn term they take part in round robin of activities called the Martlet Programme. The cadets choose to join as Army (affiliated with the Royal Regiment of Fusiliers), Royal Navy or RAF cadets and are put into recruits sections led by NCOs from their service section. During their recruit training, the cadets gain a base knowledge of cadet activities through a series of lessons led by cadet NCOs; these include drill, basic fieldcraft, campcraft and other army cadet activities, as well as lessons relating to the RAF and Royal Navy such as principles of flight, knot tying and field gun run.

Remove Training 
Upon completion of Fourth Form training, the cadets are now fully fledged cadets and begin their service specific basic training. The cadets are led by cadet NCOs, with each service being led by the cadet Head of Section ranked WO1(RSM) (Army), WO (RN), CWO (RAF), usually with a 2ic depending on the size of the section ranked WO2(CSM) (Army), CPO (RN), FS (RAF). The activities involve topics from each service's phase one training, with time given to ensure cadets are ready for their first camp opportunities. In Remove, cadets are able to attend their first camps: a weekend Easter Camp and a weeklong Summer Camp.

Fifth Form (MOI Cadre) 
In Fifth Form, cadets join the MOI Cadre in which they learn leadership and instructional skills for the Autumn term, culminating in them taking on 4th Form recruit sections as JNCOs. During this time, cadets from all 3 services attend weekly lessons together and attend a weekend Cadre Camp in which they fine tune their instructional skills and complete their MOI assessments. Upon successful completion of the MOI assessments, cadets usually qualify for promotion to become JNCOs (Army - LCpl, RN - 3 Star, RAF - LCpl). Once they are NCOs, the cadets qualify for attendance to the NCO Camp which consists of higher level fieldcraft training, with command opportunities given to those cadets who wish to try.

Sixth Form 
In Sixth Form, cadets move back to their own service sections as NCOs, now having completed their Cadre year. Now with the experience they have they work as instructors mainly to Remove cadets. Sixth Form cadets are promoted based on their merit, with the opportunity to promotion as an SNCO. At the end of Year 12, cadets are given the opportunity to apply for senior leadership positions in the CCF. Currently these roles are: Senior Cadet, Head of the Army Section, Head of the Royal Navy Section, Head of the RAF Section & Drum Major. Those appointed hold these roles for the entirety of their Upper Sixth year, in which they work closely with section staff and the Contingent Commander and SSI to plan and deliver training. At the end of their time in the CCF, Upper Sixth cadets are invited to the Tower of London (RHQ of the Royal Regiment of Fusiliers) to be dined out and rewarded for their service and dedication.

Corps of Drums 
Cadets have to option to become dual role and join the Corps of Drums. The Drums Platoon is commanded by the cadet Drum Major, who is assisted by the Drum Sergeant, Lead Tip (lead drummer) and Head of Fifes. In the Corps of Drums, cadets can choose from a number of instruments: side drum, tenor drum, bass drum, cymbals and fife (Bb flute); with the option to learn the bugle as a secondary instrument. The Mill Hill School CCF Corps of Drums is very successful, taking part in many high profile events and parades, including the annual Lord Mayor's Show. The Corps of Drums recently took part in the Lord Mayor's Music Competition, in which they won the competition for best Corps of Drums; as well as the Drum Corps' bugler winning the solo bugler competition.

Structure 
The Contingent is officially under the command of the Head of the School, however day to day running of the CCF comes under the Contingent Commander and School Staff Instructor (SSI). Each Section is Commanded by an OC, with other staff usually of officer rank. Sections are led by Cadet Heads of Sections, and dependant on size of the section a 2ic.
Contingent Commander: Major Anthony Norrington

SSI: WO1(RSM) Fritz Albrecht

Officer Commanding Army Section: Lt R. Emirali

Officer Commanding Navy Section: Lt L. Lilley

Officer Commanding RAF Section: Plt Off I. Wong

OIC Corps of Drums: Capt K Kyle

Houses
Mill Hill School is divided into houses. These are:

Boarding houses
 Burton Bank – Named to commemorate its original position on Burton Hole Lane
 Collinson – Named after Peter Collinson, who once owned what is now the estate
 Macgregor – Named after Mary Macgregor, the founder and first head of The Mount, Mill Hill International
 Ridgeway – Peter Collinson's original house on the site

Winterstoke House was converted into Grimsdell Mill Hill Pre-Preparatory School, in 1995.

Day houses
 Atkinson – Named after the first headmaster, John Atkinson
 Cedars – Named in honour of the cedars planted by Peter Collinson
 McClure – Named after Sir John McClure, headmaster at the turn of the 20th century
 Murray – Named in honour of Sir James Murray, teacher and longtime editor of the Oxford English Dictionary; who began compiling his dictionary while a master at Mill Hill
 Priestley – Named after headmaster Thomas Priestley
 School House – Named after Tite's famous building constructed in the 1820s
 Weymouth – Named after headmaster Richard Weymouth
 Winfield – Named after headmaster William Winfield

Heads
In January 2016, Frances King became the school's first female Head.

The following people have served as Head:

Evans served as head from January 1828 to June 1828.

Architecture

Chapel
Unveiled in 1896, the school chapel is a basilica in form. The architect was Basil Champneys, well known for his work at the University of Oxford and Winchester College.

School House
Designed by Sir William Tite, famous for his work on the London Royal Exchange, School House was erected in 1825 and is described as being in the Greco-Roman style.

Boarding houses
Although the number of day pupils has risen over recent years, both full and weekly boarding at Mill Hill is still possible.

Faculties and other
The school occupies a number of buildings within its site of both traditional and modern styling.

The cricket house was used as a set in the tenth episode of Inspector Morse.

In honour of Patrick Troughton the Mill Hill theatre was dedicated to the actor and named the Patrick Troughton Theatre in 2007.

The Foundation
The school is run by the Mill Hill School Foundation, a registered charity under English law. The Foundation offers education to boys and girls aged 3 to 18 in seven schools. The Foundation's other schools are:
Belmont – a day school for pupils aged 7 to 13. Head: Leon Roberts
Grimsdell – a pre-preparatory day school for pupils aged 3 to 7. Head: Kate Simon
The Mount, Mill Hill International – a mixed day and boarding school for international pupils aged 11 to 16. Head: Sarah Bellotti.
Cobham Hall –  an independent day and boarding school for girls aged 11 to 18. Head: Wendy Barrett.
Lyonsdown – an independent preparatory school for girls aged 3 to 11. Head: Rittu Hall.
Keble Prep – an independent preparatory school for boys aged 4 to 13. Head: Perran Gill.

Notable alumni

 Ethan Bamber, English county cricketer
 John Batten, physician to Queen Elizabeth II
 Michael Bishop, Baron Glendonbrook, businessman
 Jasper Britton, actor
 Russell Brain, 1st Baron Brain, neurologist
 David Buck, actor
 Richard Berengarten, poet
 Francis Cammaerts
 James Challis, astronomer
 Ernest Cook, English philanthropist and businessman (grandson of Thomas Cook)
 Chris Corner, producer and songwriter
 Francis Crick, A sculpted bust of Francis Crick by John Sherrill Houser, which incorporates a single 'Golden' Helix, was cast in bronze in the artist's studio in New Mexico, US. The bronze was first displayed at the Francis Crick Memorial Conference (on Consciousness) at the University of Cambridge's Churchill College on 7 July 2012; it was bought by Mill Hill School in May 2013, and was displayed at their inaugural Crick Dinner on 8 June 2013.
 Misha Crosby, director, actor and producer.
 Richard Dimbleby, broadcaster
 Sophia Dunkley, international cricketer
 John Richard Easonsmith, officer
 Sir Eric Errington, Bt. British barrister and Conservative Party politician
 Ivor Malcolm Haddon Etherington, mathematician
 David Dayan Fisher, actor
 Seb Fontaine, house music DJ
 Felix Francis, author of the 'Dick Francis' novels
 Nicholas Franks, Professor of Biophysics and Anaesthetics at Imperial College London
 Ben Glassberg, conductor 
 Inglis Gundry, composer, novelist, musicologist, music pedagogue and writer
 Tanika Gupta, playwright and scriptwriter
 Joseph Hardcastle, Liberal Member of Parliament
 Sir Norman Hartnell, fashion designer
 Hartley Heard, cricketer
 Thomas Helmore, choirmaster and choral historian and writer
 Francis Heron, England footballer and FA Cup winner
 Hubert Heron, England footballer and FA Cup winner
 Peter Youngblood Hills, actor
 Stanislav Ianevski, actor
 Chaz Jankel, musician
 Simon Jenkins, newspaper columnist, editor and author
 Robert Evan Kendell, psychiatrist
 Evgeny Lebedev, owner of Independent and Evening Standard newspapers
 Keith Levene, musician, Public Image Limited
 Nick Leslau, businessman
 Tom Lindsay, Rugby Union Player
 Malcolm Mackintosh, Special Operations Executive operative and intelligence analyst
 Norman Macrae, British journalist, former Deputy Editor of The Economist
 Ernest Maddox, eye surgeon and inventor of numerous optical instruments such as Maddox rod and Maddox wing
 Bob Marshall-Andrews, politician
 Harry Melling, actor
 Thanos Papalexis, convicted murderer
 Sajith Premadasa, Sri Lankan politician (Leader of the opposition)
 Adam Rossington, Middlesex cricketer
 Paul Sandifer, neurologist
 Vir Sanghvi, journalist, columnist, and talk show host
 Ernest Satow, British scholar, diplomat and Japanologist
 Daniel Sharman, actor
 Henry Shaw, botanist
 Tulip Siddiq, Labour Member of Parliament 
 George Spencer-Brown, mathematician
 Roger Spong, international rugby union footballer, England and Great Britain
 Mitchell Symons, journalist and writer
 Sir Denis Thatcher Bart., husband of the former British Prime Minister Margaret Thatcher
 David Tinker, Royal Navy officer killed in the Falklands War
 Lord Toulson, Justice of the Supreme Court
 Patrick Troughton, actor
 Austin Vince, long distance adventure motorcyclist
 Eric A. Walker, Professor Emeritus of Imperial History at the University of Cambridge
 Herbert Ward, explorer, writer and sculptor, whose statue Grief was presented to the school by the artist
 Sir Frank William Wills Kt., architect, surveyor and Lord Mayor of Bristol. He was also a member of the Wills tobacco family.
 Sir George Alfred Wills Bt. businessman and chairman  of Imperial Tobacco
 William Wills, 1st Baron Winterstoke, businessman, Liberal politician, High Sheriff of Bristol & 1st chairman of Imperial Tobacco

References
Notes

Citations

Further reading

External links

 
 Profile on ISC website
 Old Millhillians Club
 
 Institute of Historical Research and the History of Parliament Trust's early history of Mill Hill School

1807 establishments in England
Boarding schools in London
Educational institutions established in 1807
Private co-educational schools in London
Private schools in the London Borough of Barnet
Member schools of the Headmasters' and Headmistresses' Conference
Mill Hill